Chlorfenapyr is a pesticide, and specifically a pro-insecticide (meaning it is metabolized into an active insecticide after entering the host), derived from a class of microbially produced compounds known as halogenated pyrroles.

History and Applications

Chlorfenapyr was developed by Cyanamid from the natural product dioxapyrrolomycin, which was isolated from Streptomyces fumanus.

The United States Environmental Protection Agency initially denied registration in 2000 for use on cotton primarily because of concerns that the insecticide was toxic to birds and because effective alternatives were available. However, it was registered by the EPA in January, 2001 for use on non-food crops in greenhouses. In 2005, the EPA established a tolerance for residues of chlorfenapyr in or on all food commodities.  

Chlorfenapyr is also used as a wool insect-proofing agent, and was introduced as an alternative to synthetic pyrethroids due to a lower toxicity to mammalian and aquatic life.

In April 2016, in Pakistan, 31 people died when their food was spiked with chlorfenapyr.

Mode of Action

Chlorfenapyr works by disrupting the production of adenosine triphosphate, specifically, "Oxidative removal of the N-ethoxymethyl group of chlorfenapyr by mixed function oxidases forms the compound CL 303268. CL 303268 uncouples oxidative phosphorylation at the mitochondria, resulting in disruption of production of ATP, cellular death, and ultimately organism mortality."

Safety
According to its Safe Data Sheet, chlorfenapyr is "very toxic to aquatic life with long lasting effects".

Notes

External links
 31 Die in Pakistan from Chlorfenapyr poisoning
 Effects of Chlorfenapyr on Adult Birds
 Chlorfenapyr; Pesticide Tolerance
 Australian Pesticides and Veterinary Medicines Authority

Insecticides
Nitriles
Pyrroles
Bromoarenes
Chloroarenes
Trifluoromethyl compounds
Ethers